La Verendrye Provincial Park is a waterway  provincial park located in Ontario, Canada, on the border with the U.S. state of Minnesota. The park stretches from Quetico Provincial Park through Saganaga Lake, up the Pine River, across the Height of Land Portage, then down the Pigeon River to Pigeon River Provincial Park on Lake Superior. The park is named after Pierre Gaultier de Varennes, sieur de La Vérendrye, an early explorer of Canada.

The park is a "non-operating" park, meaning no fees are charged and no staff is present with only few services offered.  As part of the international boundary, the portages, lakes, and waterways along the border are open to the citizens of both nations.

La Verendrye Provincial Park is part of the historic voyageur fur trade route from Lake Superior to Winnipeg, and features several scenic diabase-capped mesas, as well as several rare plant species.

See also
List of Ontario Parks
Voyageurs National Park
Boundary Waters
Boundary Waters Canoe Area Wilderness

References

External links

Provincial parks of Ontario
Parks in Thunder Bay District
Year of establishment missing